Armored (or armoured) car or vehicle may refer to:

Wheeled armored vehicles 
 Armoured fighting vehicle, any armed combat vehicle protected by armor
 Armored car (military), a military wheeled armored vehicle
 Armored car (valuables), an armored cargo vehicle for transporting valuables
 Armored car (VIP), a civilian bullet-proof passenger car or SUV
 SWAT vehicle, an armoured vehicle used by specialised police units

Other 
 Armored Car (video game), an overhead view maze arcade game released by Stern Electronics in 1981
 Armored Car (film), 1937 American movie featuring Cesar Romero

See also